Arthur McKenzie (1914 – 1955) was a Jamaican cricketer. He played in four first-class matches for the Jamaican cricket team in 1946/47 and 1947/48.

See also
 List of Jamaican representative cricketers

References

External links
 

1914 births
1955 deaths
Jamaican cricketers
Jamaica cricketers
Cricketers from Kingston, Jamaica